Streptomyces filamentosus is a bacterium species from the genus of Streptomyces which has been isolated from soil. Streptomyces filamentosus produces caryomycin. Streptomyces filamentosus also produces the novel cyclic lipopeptide antibiotic daptomycin (US trade name: Cubicin).

See also 
 List of Streptomyces species

References

Further reading

External links
Type strain of Streptomyces filamentosus at BacDive -  the Bacterial Diversity Metadatabase

filamentosus
Bacteria described in 1953